Year 1404 (MCDIV) was a leap year starting on Tuesday (link will display the full calendar) of the Julian calendar.

Events 
 January–December 
 April or May – Battle of Blackpool Sands: Local English forces defeat an attempted raid from Saint-Malo on the port of Dartmouth, Devon; the French commander, William du Chastel, is killed.
 June 14 – Rebel leader Owain Glyndŵr, having declared himself Prince of Wales, allies with the French against the English. He later begins holding parliamentary assemblies.
 October 17 – Pope Innocent VII succeeds Pope Boniface IX, as the 204th pope.
 November 19 – St. Elizabeth's flood: A flood of the North Sea devastates parts of Flanders, Zeeland and Holland.

 Date unknown 
 Jean de Béthencourt becomes the first ruler of the Kingdom of the Canary Islands.
 Stephan Tvrtko II succeeds Stefan Ostoja as King of Bosnia.
 Peace is declared between Lithuania and the Teutonic Knights, after they agree to exchange land and form an alliance against Muscovy.
 Wallachia reaches its maximum extent under Mircea cel Bătrân.
 The University of Turin is founded.
 Timur is hit by a fever, while preparing to invade China.
 Centurione II Zaccaria succeeds Maria II Zaccaria, as ruler of the Principality of Achaea.
 Virupaksha Raya succeeds Harihara Raya II, as ruler of the Vijayanagara Empire in  present-day southern India.
 Narayana Ramadhipati succeeds Ponthea Yat, as King of Cambodia.
 Ruaidri Caech MacDermot succeeds Conchobair Óg MacDermot, as King of Magh Luirg, in present-day northeast Connacht, Ireland. 
 The city of Vicenza comes under the rule of the Venetians.

Births 
 January 18 – Sir Philip Courtenay, British noble (d. 1463)
 February 14 – Leon Battista Alberti, Italian painter, poet, and philosopher (d. 1472)
 March 25 (bapt.) – John Beaufort, 1st Duke of Somerset, English military leader (d. 1444)
 June – Murad II, Ottoman Sultan (d. 1451)
 July 6 – Yamana Sōzen, Japanese warlord and monk (d. 1473)
 July 25 – Philip I, Duke of Brabant (d. 1430)
 September 30 – Anne of Burgundy (d. 1432)
 September – Gilles de Rais, French aristocrat (d. 1440)
 October 14 – Marie of Anjou, queen of Charles VII of France (d. 1463)

Deaths 
 April 27 – Philip II, Duke of Burgundy (b. 1342)
 September 14 – Albert IV, Duke of Austria (b. 1377)
 September 27 – William of Wykeham, English bishop and statesman (b. 1320)
 October 1 – Pope Boniface IX (b. 1356)
 October 15 – Marie Valois, French princess (b. 1344)
 December 13 – Albert I, Duke of Bavaria (b. 1336)
 date unknown – Eleanor of Arborea, ruler of Sardinia (b. 1350)

References